Up Late with Alec Baldwin is a late-night talk show that aired briefly on MSNBC hosted by Alec Baldwin. The series lasted five episodes airing Fridays at 10 p.m. from October 11 to November 8, 2013, in a time-slot previously held by Lockup.

Description
Baldwin discussed current events and past experiences with various guests from news programs, politics, and the arts. The show used a multi-camera set-up. The set was fashioned after a New York City diner, and Baldwin conversed with his guests over coffee while sitting in a corner booth.

The show began its run while the host was in the midst of a two-year contract with MSNBC's production arm, Universal Television. In an interview with The Daily Beast, Baldwin stated, "I'm going to do it for a year, and then we'll see what happens."

On November 15, 2013, MSNBC announced that Up Late would be suspended for two weeks starting with that night's show after Baldwin received criticism for allegedly calling a photographer a "cock-sucking fag". Baldwin denied the specific wording of the insult, though he still released an apology for the outburst. On November 26, 2013, MSNBC announced that they had fired Baldwin and cancelled the program.

Episodes

References

External links

Baldwin's profile at MSNBC.com

2010s American late-night television series
2013 American television series debuts
2013 American television series endings
MSNBC original programming